Nothing's Changed may refer to:

 Nothing's Changed (poem), a poem by Tatamkhulu Afrika
 Nothing's Changed (album), an album by Joe Lynn Turner
 "Nothing's Changed', a 2001 song by the Calling from Camino Palmero

See also
 Nothing Has Changed (disambiguation)